Edmund Carter (died in or before 1788) was an English surveyor, topographer and tutor, known as the author of the first county history of Cambridgeshire.

Life
In earlier life, Carter was a surveyor, and worked in 1731 on a survey of an estate at Weston Longueville in Norfolk. Some years later he lived in Norwich. By 1743 he had moved to Cambridge, and ran a school near St Botolph's Church.

Carter had a wife and children, and on Cole's account was physically disabled. The family went to Ware, Hertfordshire and then Chelsea, Middlesex, where Carter was again a schoolmaster. He predeceased his wife, who died at the workhouse in Enfield on 15 September 1788.

Works
Planning to write on the history of Cambridgeshire and the University of Cambridge, Carter approached the antiquarian William Cole and was rebuffed. He found local helpers, including John Newcome.

 The History of the County of Cambridge from the Earliest Account to the Present Time, Cambridge, 1753; updated by William Upcott, London, 1819. It includes a parish-by-parish account of the iconoclasm of William Dowsing of the 1640s. Carter had manuscripts of Thomas Baker to work from, through Newcome.
 The History of the University of Cambridge from its Original to the year 1753, 1753.

Notes

External links
Attribution

English surveyors
English topographers
Schoolteachers from Cambridgeshire
18th-century deaths
Year of birth missing